Mcely is a municipality and village in Nymburk District in the Central Bohemian Region of the Czech Republic. It has about 400 inhabitants.

Notable people
Alessandro, 1st Duke of Castel Duino (1881–1937), nobleman

References

Villages in Nymburk District